Amr Hamzawy (born 1967) is an Egyptian political scientist, human rights activist and public intellectual.

Biography
Hamzawy studied political science and developmental studies in Cairo, The Hague, and Berlin. After finishing his doctoral studies and after five years of teaching in Cairo and Berlin, Hamzawy joined the Carnegie Endowment for International Peace in Washington, DC between 2005 and 2009 as a senior associate for Middle East politics. Between 2009 and 2010, he served as the research director of the Middle East Center of the Carnegie Endowment in Beirut, Lebanon. In 2011, he joined the Department of Public Policy and Administration at the American University in Cairo, where he worked for approximately 5 years. Finally, in late 2016, he moved to California, where he started teaching political science at Stanford University. He still works there today.

His research and teaching interests as well as his academic publications focus on democratization processes in Egypt, tensions between freedom and repression in the Egyptian public space, political movements and civil society in Egypt, contemporary debates in Arab political thought, and human rights and governance in the Arab world.

Hamzawy is a former member of the People's Assembly after being elected in the first Parliamentary elections in Egypt after the Egyptian Revolution of 2011. He is also a former member of the Egyptian National Council for Human Rights. Hamzawy contributes a daily column and a weekly op-ed to the Egyptian independent newspaper Al Shorouk.

Education
Hamzawy received his bachelor's degree from Cairo University in Egypt. After that he revived his master's degree from the University of Amsterdam, and another from the Institute of Social Studies in The Hague. In 2002, he received his PhD from the Free University of Berlin.

Political activism
Hamzawy used to work in the Middle East as a research director at the Carnegie Endowment for International Peace in Beirut.
He played an important role in the 2011 Egyptian revolution and he was the spokesman of the "Board of Wise Men" set up during the revolution to offer negotiations and possible solutions to the protesters and the government. After the installation of Ahmed Shafik as Prime Minister, Hamzawy was offered the position of Minister of Youth. He declined the post.
He has since become involved in the project for the establishment of a liberal party in Egypt. Hamzawy is a founding member of Freedom Egypt Party.

In 2012, Hamzawy was elected as a member of the Egyptian Parliament (constituency Heliopolis, Badr City, Shorouk, Hikestep).

In 2013, he supported the campaign of the Tamarod movement for early presidential elections in Egypt. However, in the aftermath of the military coup that followed, he spoke out against the shutdown of Islamist satellite networks and the detention of President Morsi and other Islamist leaders, and objected in a newspaper column to "the rhetoric of gloating, hatred, retribution and revenge against the Muslim Brotherhood."

Personal life
On 15 February 2012 Hamzawy married the Egyptian actress Basma Hassan at the Marriott Hotel in Cairo, and divorced in 2019. Their children are Luay, Noah and Nadya.

Selected writings
A Margin for Democracy in Egypt - The Story of An Unsuccessful Transition (in Arabic) Cairo: The Egyptian Lebanese Publishers, 2014
"On Religion, Politics, and Democratic Legitimacy in Egypt", Carnegie Middle East Center, Carnegie Endowment for International Peace (in English and Arabic), 2013
"Remarks on Political Writing and its Role in Defending Democracy, Freedoms, and Human Rights" (in Arabic) Ahram: Journal of Democracy, 2013
Between Religion and Politics, co-authored with Nathan J. Brown (political scientist)(in English and Arabic) Washington, D.C. and Beirut: Carnegie Endowment for International Peace, 2010, 
The Arab Future: Debates on Democracy, Political Islam, and Resistance (in Arabic) Beirut: Dar an-Nahar, 2010
Human Rights in the Arab World: Independent Voices (co-editor, in English) Pennsylvania: University of Pennsylvania Press, 2008,  
Contemporary Arab Political Thought: The Dialectics of Continuity and Change (in German) Hamburg: Schriften des Deutschen Orient-Instituts, 2005
Religion, State, and Politics in the Near East: An Essay Collection In Memory of Prof. Dr. Friedemann Buettner (co-editor, in German) Muenster: Lit Verlag, 2003

Publications
 Civil Society in the Middle East (book, Jan 31, 2003) .
 Human Rights in the Arab World: Independent Voices, co-edited with Anthony Chase, in 2006 Zeitgenössisches Arabisches Denken: Kontinuität und Wandel, (Verlag des Deutschen Orient-Instituts, 2005) .
 "Arab spring fever" (essay) An article from: The National Interest with Nathan J. Brown (Oct 31, 2007).
 "Party for Justice and Development in Morocco: Participation and its Discontents", (Carnegie Paper, 2008).
 "Islamists in Politics: The Dynamics of Participation" (Carnegie Paper, 2008).
 "The Draft Party Platform of the Egyptian Muslim Brotherhood: Foray Into Political Integration or Retreat Into Old Positions?", with Nathan Brown (Carnegie Paper, 2008).
 "Between Government and Opposition: The Case of the Yemeni Congregation for Reform", (Carnegie Paper, 2009).
 Getting to Pluralism: Political Actors in the Arab World (book, co-written with Marina Ottaway, 2009) .

See also
 Asmaa Mahfouz
 George Ishak
 Ahmed Ghanem
 Wael Ghonim
 Mohamed Soliman
 Hossam el-Hamalawy
 Mona Seif

References

External links
 Amr Hamzawy's Page on the Carnegie Endowment for International Peace
 Amr Hamzawy's official Facebook page
 Masr Al Hureyya official Facebook page

People of the Egyptian revolution of 2011
Egyptian activists
Egyptian dissidents
Egyptian revolutionaries
Cairo University alumni
The American University in Cairo
1967 births
Living people
Members of the Egyptian Constituent Assembly of 2012